Brigadier General Charles Elwood Yeager (February 13, 1923December 7, 2020) was a United States Air Force officer, flying ace, and record-setting test pilot who in October 1947 became the first pilot in history confirmed to have exceeded the speed of sound in level flight.

Yeager was raised in Hamlin, West Virginia. His career began in World War II as a private in the United States Army, assigned to the Army Air Forces in 1941. After serving as an aircraft mechanic, in September 1942, he entered enlisted pilot training and upon graduation was promoted to the rank of flight officer (the World War II Army Air Force version of the Army's warrant officer), later achieving most of his aerial victories as a P-51 Mustang fighter pilot on the Western Front, where he was credited with shooting down 11.5 enemy aircraft (the half credit is from a second pilot assisting him in a single shootdown). On October 12, 1944, he attained "ace in a day" status, shooting down five enemy aircraft in one mission.

After the war, Yeager became a test pilot and flew many types of aircraft, including experimental rocket-powered aircraft for the National Advisory Committee for Aeronautics (NACA). He then went on to break several other speed and altitude records in the following years. In 1962, he became the first commandant of the USAF Aerospace Research Pilot School, which trained and produced astronauts for NASA and the Air Force.

Yeager later commanded fighter squadrons and wings in Germany, as well as in Southeast Asia during the Vietnam War. In recognition of his achievements and the outstanding performance ratings of those units, he was promoted to brigadier general in 1969 and inducted into the National Aviation Hall of Fame in 1973, retiring on March 1, 1975. His three-war active-duty flying career spanned more than 30 years and took him to many parts of the world, including the Korean War zone and the Soviet Union during the height of the Cold War.

Yeager is referred to by many as one of the greatest pilots of all time, and was ranked fifth on Flying list of the 51 Heroes of Aviation in 2013. Throughout his life, he flew more than 360 different types of aircraft over a 70-year period, and continued to fly for two decades after retirement as a consultant pilot for the United States Air Force.

Early life and education 
Yeager was born February 13, 1923, in Myra, West Virginia, to farming parents Albert Hal Yeager (1896–1963) and Susie Mae Yeager (1898–1987). When he was five years old, his family moved to Hamlin, West Virginia. Yeager had two brothers, Roy and Hal Jr., and two sisters, Doris Ann (accidentally killed at age two by six-year-old Roy playing with a firearm) and Pansy Lee.

He attended Hamlin High School, where he played basketball and football, receiving his best grades in geometry and typing. He graduated from high school in June 1941.

His first experience with the military was as a teen at the Citizens Military Training Camp at Fort Benjamin Harrison, Indianapolis, Indiana, during the summers of 1939 and 1940. On February 26, 1945, Yeager married Glennis Dickhouse, and the couple had four children. Glennis Yeager died in 1990, predeceasing her husband by 30 years.

His cousin, Steve Yeager, was a professional baseball catcher.

Career

World War II 
Yeager enlisted as a private in the U.S. Army Air Forces (USAAF) on September 12, 1941, and became an aircraft mechanic at George Air Force Base, Victorville, California. At enlistment, Yeager was not eligible for flight training because of his age and educational background, but the entry of the U.S. into World War II less than three months later prompted the USAAF to alter its recruiting standards.

At the time of his flight training acceptance, he was a crew chief on an AT-11. He received his pilot wings and a promotion to flight officer at Luke Field, Arizona, where he graduated from Class 43C on March 10, 1943. Assigned to the 357th Fighter Group at Tonopah, Nevada, he initially trained as a fighter pilot, flying Bell P-39 Airacobras (being grounded for seven days for clipping a farmer's tree during a training flight), and shipped overseas with the group on November 23, 1943.

Stationed in the United Kingdom at RAF Leiston, Yeager flew P-51 Mustangs in combat with the 363d Fighter Squadron. He named his aircraft Glamorous Glen after his girlfriend, Glennis Faye Dickhouse, who became his wife in February 1945. Yeager had gained one victory before he was shot down over France in his first aircraft (P-51B-5-NA s/n 43-6763) on March 5, 1944, on his eighth mission. He escaped to Spain on March 30, 1944, with the help of the Maquis (French Resistance) and returned to England on May 15, 1944. During his stay with the Maquis, Yeager assisted the guerrillas in duties that did not involve direct combat; he helped construct bombs for the group, a skill that he had learned from his father. He was awarded the Bronze Star for helping a navigator, Omar M. "Pat" Patterson, Jr., to cross the Pyrenees.

Despite a regulation prohibiting "evaders" (escaped pilots) from flying over enemy territory again, the purpose of which was to prevent resistance groups from being compromised by giving the enemy a second chance to possibly capture him, Yeager was reinstated to flying combat. He had joined another evader, fellow P-51 pilot 1st Lt Fred Glover, in speaking directly to the Supreme Allied Commander, General Dwight D. Eisenhower, on June 12, 1944. "I raised so much hell that General Eisenhower finally let me go back to my squadron" Yeager said. "He cleared me for combat after D Day, because all the free Frenchmen – Maquis and people like that – had surfaced". Eisenhower, after gaining permission from the War Department to decide the requests, concurred with Yeager and Glover. In the meantime, Yeager shot down his second enemy aircraft, a German Junkers Ju 88 bomber, over the English Channel.

Yeager demonstrated outstanding flying skills and combat leadership. On October 12, 1944, he became the first pilot in his group to make "ace in a day," downing five enemy aircraft in a single mission. Two of these victories were scored without firing a single shot: when he flew into firing position against a Messerschmitt Bf 109, the pilot of the aircraft panicked, breaking to port and colliding with his wingman. Yeager said both pilots bailed out. He finished the war with 11.5 official victories, including one of the first air-to-air victories over a jet fighter, a German Messerschmitt Me 262 that he shot down as it was on final approach for landing.

In his 1986 memoirs, Yeager recalled with disgust that "atrocities were committed by both sides", and said he went on a mission with orders from the Eighth Air Force to "strafe anything that moved". During the mission briefing, he whispered to Major Donald H. Bochkay, "If we are going to do things like this, we sure as hell better make sure we are on the winning side". Yeager said, "I'm certainly not proud of that particular strafing mission against civilians. But it is there, on the record and in my memory". He also expressed bitterness at his treatment in England during World War II, describing the British as "arrogant" and "nasty".

Yeager was commissioned a second lieutenant while at Leiston, and was promoted to captain before the end of his tour. He flew his 61st and final mission on January 15, 1945, and returned to the United States in early February 1945. As an evader, he received his choice of assignments and, because his new wife was pregnant, chose Wright Field to be near his home in West Virginia. His high number of flight hours and maintenance experience qualified him to become a functional test pilot of repaired aircraft, which brought him under the command of Colonel Albert Boyd, head of the Aeronautical Systems Flight Test Division.

Post-World War II

Test pilot – breaking the sound barrier 

Yeager remained in the U.S. Army Air Forces after the war, becoming a test pilot at Muroc Army Air Field (now Edwards Air Force Base), following graduation from Air Materiel Command Flight Performance School (Class 46C). After Bell Aircraft test pilot Chalmers "Slick" Goodlin demanded  to break the sound "barrier", the USAAF selected the 24-year-old Yeager to fly the rocket-powered Bell XS-1 in a NACA program to research high-speed flight. Under the National Security Act of 1947, the USAAF became the United States Air Force (USAF) on September 18.

Such was the difficulty of this task that the answer to many of the inherent challenges was along the lines of "Yeager better have paid-up insurance". Two nights before the scheduled date for the flight, Yeager broke two ribs when he fell from a horse. He was worried that the injury would remove him from the mission and reported that he went to a civilian doctor in nearby Rosamond, who taped his ribs. Besides his wife who was riding with him, Yeager told only his friend and fellow project pilot Jack Ridley about the accident. On the day of the flight, Yeager was in such pain that he could not seal the X-1's hatch by himself. Ridley rigged up a device, using the end of a broom handle as an extra lever, to allow Yeager to seal the hatch.

The success of the mission was not announced to the public for nearly eight months, until June 10, 1948. Yeager was awarded the Mackay Trophy and the Collier Trophy in 1948 for his mach-transcending flight, and the Harmon International Trophy in 1954. The X-1 he flew that day was later put on permanent display at the Smithsonian Institution's National Air and Space Museum. During 1952, he attended the Air Command and Staff College.

Yeager went on to break many other speed and altitude records. He was also one of the first American pilots to fly a Mikoyan-Gurevich MiG-15, after its pilot, No Kum-sok, defected to South Korea. Returning to Muroc, during the latter half of 1953, Yeager was involved with the USAF team that was working on the X-1A, an aircraft designed to surpass Mach 2 in level flight. That year, he flew a chase aircraft for the civilian pilot Jackie Cochran as she became the first woman to fly faster than sound.

On November 20, 1953, the U.S. Navy program involving the D-558-II Skyrocket and its pilot, Scott Crossfield, became the first team to reach twice the speed of sound. After they were bested, Ridley and Yeager decided to beat rival Crossfield's speed record in a series of test flights that they dubbed "Operation NACA Weep". Not only did they beat Crossfield by setting a new record at Mach 2.44 on December 12, 1953, but they did it in time to spoil a celebration planned for the 50th anniversary of flight in which Crossfield was to be called "the fastest man alive".

The new record flight, however, did not entirely go to plan, since shortly after reaching Mach 2.44, Yeager lost control of the X-1A at about  due to inertia coupling, a phenomenon largely unknown at the time. He then managed to land without further incident. For this feat, Yeager was awarded the Distinguished Service Medal (DSM) in 1954.

Military command 

Yeager was foremost a fighter pilot and held several squadron and wing commands. From 1954 to 1957, he commanded the F-86H Sabre-equipped 417th Fighter-Bomber Squadron (50th Fighter-Bomber Wing) at Hahn AB, West Germany, and Toul-Rosieres Air Base, France; and from 1957 to 1960 the F-100D Super Sabre-equipped 1st Fighter Day Squadron at George Air Force Base, California, and Morón Air Base, Spain.

Now a full colonel in 1962, after completion of a year's studies and final thesis on STOL aircraft  at the Air War College, Yeager became the first commandant of the USAF Aerospace Research Pilot School, which produced astronauts for NASA and the USAF, after its redesignation from the USAF Flight Test Pilot School. (Yeager himself had only a high school education, so he was not eligible to become an astronaut like those he trained.) In April 1962, Yeager made his only flight with Neil Armstrong. Their job, flying a T-33, was to evaluate Smith Ranch Dry Lake in Nevada for use as an emergency landing site for the North American X-15. In his autobiography, Yeager wrote that he knew the lake bed was unsuitable for landings after recent rains, but Armstrong insisted on flying out anyway. As Armstrong suggested that they do a touch-and-go, Yeager advised against it, telling him "You may touch, but you ain't gonna go!"  When Armstrong did touch down, the wheels became stuck in the mud, bringing the plane to a sudden stop and provoking Yeager to fits of laughter. They had to wait for rescue.

Yeager's participation in the test pilot training program for NASA included controversial behavior. Yeager reportedly did not believe that Ed Dwight, the first African American pilot admitted into the program, should be a part of it. In the 2019 documentary series Chasing the Moon, the filmmakers made the claim that Yeager instructed staff and participants at the school that "Washington is trying to cram the nigger down our throats. [President] Kennedy is using this to make 'racial equality,' so do not speak to him, do not socialize with him, do not drink with him, do not invite him over to your house, and in six months he'll be gone."  In his autobiography, Dwight details how Yeager's leadership led to discriminatory treatment throughout his training at Edwards Air Force Base.

Between December 1963 and January 1964, Yeager completed five flights in the NASA M2-F1 lifting body. An accident during a December 1963 test flight in one of the school's NF-104s resulted in serious injuries. After climbing to a near-record altitude, the plane's controls became ineffective, and it entered a flat spin. After several turns, and an altitude loss of approximately 95,000 feet, Yeager ejected from the plane. During the ejection, the seat straps released normally, but the seat base slammed into Yeager, with the still-hot rocket motor breaking his helmet's plastic faceplate and causing his emergency oxygen supply to catch fire. The resulting burns to his face required extensive and agonizing medical care.  This was Yeager's last attempt at setting test-flying records.

In 1966, Yeager took command of the 405th Tactical Fighter Wing at Clark Air Base, the Philippines, whose squadrons were deployed on rotational temporary duty (TDY) in South Vietnam and elsewhere in Southeast Asia. There he flew 127 missions. In February 1968, Yeager was assigned command of the 4th Tactical Fighter Wing at Seymour Johnson Air Force Base, North Carolina, and led the McDonnell Douglas F-4 Phantom II wing in South Korea during the Pueblo crisis.

Yeager was promoted to brigadier general and was assigned in July 1969 as the vice-commander of the Seventeenth Air Force.

From 1971 to 1973, at the behest of Ambassador Joseph Farland, Yeager was assigned as the Air Attache in Pakistan to advise the Pakistan Air Force which was led by Abdur Rahim Khan (the first Pakistani to break the sound barrier). He arrived in Pakistan at a time when tensions with India were at a high level. One of Yeager's jobs during this time was to assist Pakistani technicians in installing AIM-9 Sidewinders on PAF's Shenyang F-6 fighters. He also had a keen interest in interacting with PAF personnel from various Pakistani Squadrons and helping them develop combat tactics. In one instance in 1972, while visiting the No. 15 Squadron "Cobras" at Peshawar Airbase, the Squadron's OC Wing Commander Najeeb Khan escorted him to K2 in a pair of F-86Fs after Yeager requested a visit to the second highest mountain on Earth. After hostilities broke out in 1971, he decided to stay in West Pakistan and continued overseeing the PAF's operations. Yeager recalled "the Pakistanis whipped the Indians’ asses in the sky... the Pakistanis scored a three-to-one kill ratio, knocking out 102 Russian-made Indian jets and losing 34 airplanes of their own". During the war, he flew around the western front in a helicopter documenting wreckages of Indian warplanes of Soviet origin which included Sukhoi Su-7s and MiG-21s; they were transported to the United States after the war for analysis. Yeager also flew around in his Beechcraft Queen Air, a small passenger aircraft that was assigned to him by the Pentagon, picking up shot-down Indian fighter pilots. The Beechcraft was later destroyed during an air raid by the Indian Air Force at a PAF airbase. Yeager was not present in the aircraft. Edward C. Ingraham, a U.S. diplomat who had served as political counselor to Ambassador Farland in Islamabad, recalled this incident in the Washington Monthly of October 1985: "After Yeager's Beechcraft was destroyed during an Indian air raid, he raged to his cowering colleagues that the Indian pilot had been specifically instructed by Indira Gandhi to blast his plane. 'It was', he later wrote, 'the Indian way of giving Uncle Sam the finger'". Yeager was incensed over the incident and demanded U.S. retaliation.

Post-retirement career 

On March 1, 1975, following assignments in West Germany and Pakistan, Yeager retired from the Air Force at Norton Air Force Base, California.

Yeager made a cameo appearance in the movie The Right Stuff (1983). He played "Fred", a bartender at "Pancho's Place", which was most appropriate, as Yeager said, "if all the hours were ever totaled, I reckon I spent more time at her place than in a cockpit over those years". Sam Shepard portrayed Yeager in the film, which chronicles in part his famous 1947 record-breaking flight. Also in popular culture, Yeager has been referenced several times as being part of the shared Star Trek universe, including having a fictional type of starship named after him and appearing in archival footage within the opening title sequence for the series Star Trek: Enterprise (2001–2005). For that same series, executive producer Rick Berman said that he envisaged the lead character, Captain Jonathan Archer, as being "halfway between Chuck Yeager and Han Solo."

For several years in the 1980s, Yeager was connected to General Motors, publicizing ACDelco, the company's automotive parts division. In 1986, he was invited to drive the Chevrolet Corvette pace car for the 70th running of the Indianapolis 500. In 1988, Yeager was again invited to drive the pace car, this time at the wheel of an Oldsmobile Cutlass Supreme. In 1986, President Reagan appointed Yeager to the Rogers Commission that investigated the explosion of the Space Shuttle Challenger.

During this time, Yeager also served as a technical adviser for three Electronic Arts flight simulator video games. The games include Chuck Yeager's Advanced Flight Trainer, Chuck Yeager's Advanced Flight Trainer 2.0, and Chuck Yeager's Air Combat. The game manuals featured quotes and anecdotes from Yeager and were well received by players. Missions featured several of Yeager's accomplishments and let players attempt to top his records. Chuck Yeager's Advanced Flight Trainer was Electronic Art's top-selling game for 1987.

In 2009, Yeager participated in the documentary The Legend of Pancho Barnes and the Happy Bottom Riding Club, a profile of his friend Pancho Barnes. The documentary was screened at film festivals, aired on public television in the United States, and won an Emmy Award.

On October 14, 1997, on the 50th anniversary of his historic flight past Mach 1, he flew a new Glamorous Glennis III, an F-15D Eagle, past Mach 1. The chase plane for the flight was an F-16 Fighting Falcon piloted by Bob Hoover, a longtime test, fighter, and aerobatic pilot who had been Yeager's wingman for the first supersonic flight. At the end of his speech to the crowd in 1997, Yeager concluded, "All that I am ... I owe to the Air Force". Later that month, he was the recipient of the Tony Jannus Award for his achievements.

On October 14, 2012, on the 65th anniversary of breaking the sound barrier, Yeager did it again at the age of 89, flying as co-pilot in a McDonnell Douglas F-15 Eagle piloted by Captain David Vincent out of Nellis Air Force Base.

Awards and decorations 

In 1973, Yeager was inducted into the National Aviation Hall of Fame, arguably aviation's highest honor. In 1974, Yeager received the Golden Plate Award of the American Academy of Achievement. In December 1975, the U.S. Congress awarded Yeager a silver medal "equivalent to a noncombat Medal of Honor ... for contributing immeasurably to aerospace science by risking his life in piloting the X-1 research airplane faster than the speed of sound on October 14, 1947". President Gerald Ford presented the medal to Yeager in a ceremony at the White House on December 8, 1976.

Yeager, who never attended college and was often modest about his background, is considered by many, including Flying Magazine, the California Hall of Fame, the State of West Virginia, National Aviation Hall of Fame, a few U.S. presidents, and the United States Army Air Force, to be one of the greatest pilots of all time. Air & Space/Smithsonian magazine ranked him the fifth greatest pilot of all time in 2003. Despite his lack of higher education, West Virginia's Marshall University named its highest academic scholarship the Society of Yeager Scholars in his honor. Yeager was also the chairman of Experimental Aircraft Association (EAA)'s Young Eagle Program from 1994 to 2004, and was named the program's chairman emeritus.

In 1966, Yeager was inducted into the International Air & Space Hall of Fame. He was inducted into the International Space Hall of Fame in 1981. He was inducted into the Aerospace Walk of Honor 1990 inaugural class.

Yeager Airport in Charleston, West Virginia, is named in his honor. The Interstate 64/Interstate 77 bridge over the Kanawha River in Charleston is named in his honor. He also flew directly under the Kanawha Bridge and West Virginia named it the Chuck E. Yeager Bridge. On October 19, 2006, the state of West Virginia also honored Yeager with a marker along Corridor G (part of U.S. Highway 119) in his home Lincoln County, and also renamed part of the highway the Yeager Highway.

Yeager was an honorary board member of the humanitarian organization Wings of Hope. On August 25, 2009, Governor Arnold Schwarzenegger and Maria Shriver announced that Yeager would be one of 13 California Hall of Fame inductees in The California Museum's yearlong exhibit. The induction ceremony was on December 1, 2009, in Sacramento, California. Flying Magazine ranked Yeager number 5 on its 2013 list of The 51 Heroes of Aviation; for many years, he was the highest-ranked living person on the list.

The Civil Air Patrol, the volunteer auxiliary of the USAF, awards the Charles E. "Chuck" Yeager Award to its senior members as part of its Aerospace Education program.

Other achievements 

 1940–1949 – Harmon Trophy: Citation of Honorable Mention
 1947 – Collier Trophy and Mackay Trophy, for breaking the sound barrier for the first time.
 1953 – Harmon Trophy
 1976 – Congressional Silver Medal

Dates of rank

Personal life 

Yeager named his plane after his wife, Glennis, as a good-luck charm: "You're my good-luck charm, hon. Any airplane I name after you always brings me home." Yeager and Glennis moved to Grass Valley, California, after his retirement from the Air Force in 1975. The couple prospered because of Yeager's best-selling autobiography, speaking engagements, and commercial ventures. Glennis Yeager died of ovarian cancer in 1990. They had four children (Susan, Don, Mickey, and Sharon). Yeager's son Mickey (Michael) died unexpectedly in Oregon, on March 26, 2011.

Yeager appeared in a Texas advertisement for George H. W. Bush's 1988 presidential campaign.
In 2000, Yeager met actress Victoria Scott D'Angelo on a hiking trail in Nevada County. The pair started dating shortly thereafter, and married in August 2003. Subsequent to the commencement of their relationship, a bitter dispute arose between Yeager, his children and D'Angelo. The children contended that D'Angelo, at least 35 years Yeager's junior, had married him for his fortune. Yeager and D'Angelo both denied the charge. Litigation ensued, in which his children accused D'Angelo of "undue influence" on Yeager, and Yeager accused his children of diverting millions of dollars from his assets. In August 2008, the California Court of Appeal ruled for Yeager, finding that his daughter Susan had breached her duty as trustee.

Yeager lived in Grass Valley, Northern California and died in the afternoon of December 7, 2020 (National Pearl Harbor Remembrance Day), at age 97, in a Los Angeles hospital.

See also 
 History of aviation
 List of firsts in aviation
 Society of Experimental Test Pilots

Notes

References

Further reading 

 
 
 Wolfe, Tom The Right Stuff New York: Farrar-Straus-Giroux, 1979 
 Yeager, Chuck, Bob Cardenas, Bob Hoover, Jack Russell and James Young The Quest for Mach One: A First-Person Account of Breaking the Sound Barrier New York: Penguin Studio, 1997 
 Yeager, Chuck and Leo Janos, Yeager: An Autobiography New York: Bantam, 1985

External links

 
 Biography from ChuckYeager.org
 U.S. Air Force: Chuck Yeager biography
 Yeager in Biography.com
 Biography in the National Aviation Hall of Fame 
 General Chuck Yeager, USAF, Biography and Interview with American Academy of Achievement
 
 [http://airportjournals.com/chuck-yeager-booming-and-zooming-part-1/ Airport Journals''' "Chuck Yeager: Booming And Zooming" Part 1] and Part 2
 "Chuck Yeager & the Sound Barrier" in Aerospaceweb.org
 Space.com: Chuck Yeager
 
 
 Yeager obituary via The New York Times''

 
1923 births
2020 deaths
American Vietnam War pilots
American World War II flying aces
United States Air Force personnel of the Vietnam War
American aviation record holders
American expatriates in Pakistan
American test pilots
Articles containing video clips
Aviation history of the United States
Aviation pioneers
Aviators from West Virginia
Collier Trophy recipients
American people of German descent
Experimental Aircraft Association
Harmon Trophy winners
Mackay Trophy winners
Military personnel from West Virginia
National Aviation Hall of Fame inductees
People from Lincoln County, West Virginia
People from Hamlin, West Virginia
Presidential Medal of Freedom recipients
Recipients of the Air Force Distinguished Service Medal
Recipients of the Air Medal
Recipients of the Distinguished Flying Cross (United States)
Recipients of the Distinguished Service Medal (US Army)
Chevaliers of the Légion d'honneur
Order of National Security Merit members
Recipients of the Legion of Merit
Recipients of the Silver Star
Shot-down aviators
Survivors of aviation accidents or incidents
U.S. Air Force Test Pilot School alumni
United States Air Force generals
United States Army Air Forces officers
United States Army Air Forces pilots of World War II